The Best News Story is an award presented annually at the Star Awards, a ceremony that was established in 1994.

The category was introduced in 2001, at the 8th Star Awards ceremony; Zhu Hong received the award for her performance and it is given in honour of a Mediacorp presenter who has delivered an outstanding performance in a news programme. The nominees are determined by a team of judges employed by Mediacorp; winners are selected by a majority vote from the entire judging panel.

Since its inception, the award has been given to sixteen journalists. Lip was the most recent winner in this category. Since the ceremony held in 2016, Evelyn Lam is also the only journalist to win in this category thrice, surpassing Ng Lian Cheong and Chen Meiling who all have two wins each. In addition, Ng has been nominated on four occasions, more than any other journalist. Hu Jielan holds the record for the most nominations without a win, with three.

Recipients

 Each year is linked to the article about the Star Awards held that year.

Category facts

Most wins

Most nominations

References

External links 

Star Awards